Platyptilia kozanica is a moth of the family Pterophoridae. It is known from Turkey.

The wingspan is about 21 mm. Adults are on wing in May.

External links
Federmotten aus der Mongolei, Russland, der Türkei, der Balkanhalbinsel und Afrika, mit Beschreibung neuer Arten (Microlepidoptera: Pterophoridae)

kozanica
Endemic fauna of Turkey
Moths described in 2003